Frontiers of Law in China is a quarterly peer-reviewed academic journal established in 2006 and co-published by Springer Science+Business Media and Higher Education Press, a publisher owned by China's Ministry of Education. Topics covered include jurisprudence, civil and commercial law, economic law, environmental law, intellectual property, criminal justice, procedural law, administrative law, international law, and legal history.

Abstracting and indexing 
The journal is abstracted and indexed in Academic OneFile and Scopus.

External links 

General law journals
Quarterly journals
Publications established in 2006
Springer Science+Business Media academic journals
English-language journals